Louis McLaughlin Orr (May 7, 1958 – December 15, 2022) was an American basketball player and coach. He played professionally in the National Basketball Association (NBA) and became a college basketball coach. Orr was the head coach at Bowling Green State University
from 2007–2014 and at Seton Hall from 2001 until 2006. He was formerly an assistant at Xavier University, Providence College and his alma mater Syracuse University, before getting his first head coaching job at Siena College. He was also an assistant coach at Georgetown under his former New York Knicks teammate Patrick Ewing.

Playing career
Orr attended Withrow High School where he was coached by Charles Cadle. Orr played at Syracuse University from 1976 to 1980 and was part of the famed "Louie & Bouie Show" with teammate Roosevelt Bouie. The duo was named so after the student newspaper The Daily Orange ran a caricature of them heading up the basketball court in tuxedos and top hats. After graduating from Syracuse in 1980, he was the 28th pick in the 1980 NBA draft, selected by the Indiana Pacers. Orr played two seasons with the Pacers, which included a playoff appearance his rookie season, during which Orr averaged 12 points, 5 rebounds, and 2.5 steals a game in a first round loss against the Philadelphia 76ers. After that, he moved on to the New York Knicks, and played for six years, with three overall playoff berths. Orr averaged career highs in points and rebounds for the Knicks, with 12.7 and 4.9, respectively, in the 1984–85 season. On January 20, 1987, Orr scored 8 points, grabbed 6 rebounds, recorded 6 assists, and hit a game-winning three point shot as time expired in a 111-109 win over the Boston Celtics. He scored over 5,500 career points as a pro.

Coaching career
He got his first assistant coaching job in 1990 with Xavier in Cincinnati, Ohio, the city where Orr was from. Then, in 1994, he began serving under Pete Gillen at Providence and soon he was an assistant under Jim Boeheim and the Syracuse Orangemen. During his tenure there, he rose to become a noted assistant, and helped them to a 92–40 record in that time. Syracuse reached the Sweet 16 of the NCAA tournament twice during Orr's time there.

Siena
In 2000, Orr received his first head coaching job, accepting the position as head coach of the men's basketball team at Siena College.  In his lone year at Siena, Orr led the Saints to a three-way tie for first place in the Metro Atlantic Athletic Conference and a 20–11 record, the best ever for a first-year Siena coach. Siena broke many attendance records that year as well.

Seton Hall 
Orr became the first former Big East player to become a head coach in the conference after he was hired in 2001 by Seton Hall after Tommy Amaker left to become the head coach at Michigan. In his first year in the Big East Conference, Orr went 12–18, but was noted for playing Duke very close in the Maui Invitational.

By his fifth season at Seton Hall, Orr had led the Pirates to two NCAA Tournaments in three years. In the 2004 NCAA tournament, Seton Hall defeated the 9th seed Arizona in the first round before falling to 1st seed Duke in the second round. During the 2005–06 season, Orr led Seton Hall to a 9–7 record in the Big East and an 18–12 record overall.  Seton Hall was seeded 10th in the 2006 NCAA tournament and played the 7th seed Wichita State, falling 86–66. Although Orr had made the NCAA tournament twice and the NIT once in his five seasons at Seton Hall, concerns about lackluster recruiting resulted in his firing after the 2005–06 season with a record of 80–69.

Bowling Green
After sitting out from coaching for a season, Orr was hired to become the men's basketball coach at Bowling Green State University, replacing former head coach Dan Dakich whose contract was not renewed by Bowling Green after ten seasons.  In his first season at Bowling Green, Orr posted a 13–17 overall record and 7–9 record in the MAC, finishing 5th in the East Division.  The following season, Orr led Bowling Green to their 10th MAC regular season title after the Falcons posted an 11–5 conference record.  Although the top seed in the conference tournament, Bowling Green would fall in the tournament semifinals to eventual champion Akron.  As the MAC regular season champion, Bowling Green received an automatic bid to the 2009 National Invitation Tournament.  Bowling Green was the 8th seed in bracket 3 and played at the bracket's top seed Creighton.  Bowling Green made a strong comeback, but fell short, losing to Creighton 73–71 in their first-round game.  Orr was named the MAC Coach of the Year for Bowling Green's performance during the 2008–09 season.

On March 11, 2014 Bowling Green announced that it would not renew Orr's contract. Orr was 101–121 in seven seasons, including a record of 54–60 in Mid-American Conference play.

Death
On December 15, 2022, Orr died of melanoma at his home in Cincinnati at the age of 64.

Career statistics

NBA

Source

Regular season

|-
|style="text-align:left;"|
|style="text-align:left;"|Indiana
|82||||21.8||.491||.000||.807||4.4||1.6||.7||.3||10.5
|-
|style="text-align:left;"|
|style="text-align:left;"|Indiana
|80||41||24.4||.497||.125||.799||4.1||1.7||.7||.3||11.5
|-
|style="text-align:left;"|
|style="text-align:left;"|New York
|82||14||20.3||.462||.000||.800||2.8||1.1||.8||.3||8.4
|-
|style="text-align:left;"|
|style="text-align:left;"|New York
|78||20||21.0||.458||–||.820||2.9||.8||.8||.2||8.9
|-
|style="text-align:left;"|
|style="text-align:left;"|New York
|79||31||31.0||.486||.100||.784||4.9||1.7||1.3||.3||12.7
|-
|style="text-align:left;"|
|style="text-align:left;"|New York
|74||64||30.2||.445||.000||.784||4.2||2.4||.8||.4||11.9
|-
|style="text-align:left;"|
|style="text-align:left;"|New York
|65||8||22.2||.427||.200||.727||3.6||1.7||.7||.3||7.0
|-
|style="text-align:left;"|
|style="text-align:left;"|New York
|29||0||6.2||.320||.000||.500||1.2||.3||.2||.0||1.4
|- class=sortbottom
|style="text-align:center;" colspan=2|Career
|569||178||23.5||.468||.083||.787||3.7||1.5||.8||.3||9.7

Playoffs

|-
|style="text-align:left;"|1981
|style="text-align:left;"|Indiana
|2||||28.0||.360||–||.857||5.0||2.0||2.5||.5||12.0
|-
|style="text-align:left;"|1983
|style="text-align:left;"|New York
|6||||17.5||.383||–||1.000||3.5||.5||.8||.7||7.7
|-
|style="text-align:left;"|1984
|style="text-align:left;"|New York
|12||||18.1||.414||–||.789||4.2||.5||.3||.1||6.1
|-
|style="text-align:left;"|1988
|style="text-align:left;"|New York
|2||0||1.5||.000||–||.500||1.0||.0||.0||.0||.5
|- class="sortbottom"
|style="text-align:center;" colspan=2|Career
|22||0||17.9||.392||–||.842||3.8||.6||.6||.3||6.5

Head coaching record

References

External links

Orangehoops.org with an Orr profile
Bowling Green profile

1958 births
2022 deaths
20th-century African-American sportspeople
21st-century African-American people
African-American basketball coaches
African-American basketball players
American men's basketball players
Basketball coaches from Ohio
Basketball players from Cincinnati
Bowling Green Falcons men's basketball coaches
College men's basketball head coaches in the United States
Georgetown Hoyas men's basketball coaches
Indiana Pacers draft picks
Indiana Pacers players
New York Knicks players
Power forwards (basketball)
Providence Friars men's basketball coaches
Seton Hall Pirates men's basketball coaches
Siena Saints men's basketball coaches
Small forwards
Syracuse Orange men's basketball coaches
Syracuse Orange men's basketball players
Xavier Musketeers men's basketball coaches